Mitchell Jackson or variant, may refer to:

 Mitchell Jackson (1816–1900), diarist and second owner of the Mitchell Jackson Farmhouse
 E. Belle Mitchell Jackson (1848–1942; surnamed Mitchell Jackson), American abolitionist and educator
 Mitchell S. Jackson, American writer

See also

 Juanita Jackson Mitchell (1913-1992; surnamed Jackson Mitchell), American lawyer
 Michael Jackson (disambiguation)
 Mitchell (disambiguation)
 Jackson (disambiguation)